This is a full list of all Brazilian medalists at the Olympic Games. For more information about Brazil at the Olympics, click here.

List of medalists

In 2004, Vanderlei Cordeiro de Lima was awarded the Pierre de Coubertin medal, a rare honor given by the International Olympic Committee. Until that date, it had been awarded only 9 times.

Multiple medalists 
According to official data of the International Olympic Committee, this is a list of all athletes with at least two Olympic medals representing Brazil. The list is sorted by most gold medals, most silver medals, most bronze medals.

See also
List of Pan American medalists for Brazil

References

Olympic medalists for Brazil
Lists of Olympic medalists